The 2001 US Open was held between August 27 – September 9, 2001. It was the final Grand Slam event of 2001.

Marat Safin was unsuccessful in his title defence, being defeated in the semifinals by Pete Sampras in a rematch of the 2000 final, while Venus Williams was successful in her title defense, beating her sister Serena in the women's final. 20-year-old Australian Lleyton Hewitt won the men's title, defeating Sampras in the final. It was the second consecutive US Open final defeat for Sampras.

Seniors

Men's singles

 Lleyton Hewitt defeated  Pete Sampras, 7–6(7–4), 6–1, 6–1
It was Hewitt's 8th title of the year, and his 10th overall. It was his first career Grand Slam title, and he became the youngest male ever to be ranked number one, at the age of 20.

Women's singles

 Venus Williams defeated  Serena Williams, 6–2, 6–4
It was Venus's 6th title of the year, and her 21st overall. It was her 4th career Grand Slam title, and her 2nd US Open title.

Men's doubles

 Wayne Black /  Kevin Ullyett defeated  Donald Johnson /  Jared Palmer, 7–6, 2–6, 6–3

Women's doubles

 Lisa Raymond /  Rennae Stubbs defeated  Kimberly Po /  Nathalie Tauziat, 6–2, 5–7, 7–5

Mixed doubles

 Rennae Stubbs /  Todd Woodbridge defeated  Lisa Raymond /  Leander Paes, 6–4, 5–7, [11–9]
• It was Stubbs' 2nd and last career Grand Slam mixed doubles title and her 1st and only title at the US Open.
• It was Woodbridge's 7th and last career Grand Slam mixed doubles title and his 3rd title at the US Open.

Juniors

Boys' singles
 Gilles Müller defeated  Yeu-Tzuoo Wang, 7–6(5), 6–2.

Girls' singles
 Marion Bartoli defeated  Svetlana Kuznetsova, 4–6, 6–3, 6–4.

Boys' doubles
 Tomáš Berdych /  Stéphane Bohli defeated  Brendan Evans /  Brett Joelson, 6–4, 6–4.

Girls' doubles
 Galina Fokina /  Svetlana Kuznetsova defeated  Jelena Janković /  Matea Mezak, 7–5, 6–3.

Notes

References

External links
 Official US Open website
 Archived day-by-day results on SI.com

 
 

 
US Open
US Open
2001
US Open
US Open
US Open